Manning Hedges Whiley (23 January 191529 January 1975) was a British actor.

Partial filmography

 Trunk Crime (1939) - Bentley
 The Four Just Men (1939) - (uncredited)
 Pack Up Your Troubles (1940) - Muller
 Contraband (1940) - Manager of 'Mousetrap'
 Pastor Hall (1940) - Vogel
 The Flying Squad (1940) - Ronald Perryman
 Saloon Bar (1940) - Evangelist
 Sailors Three (1940) - German Commdr.
 Freedom Radio (1941) - S.S. Trooper
 Gasbags (1941) - O.P. Colonel
 The Ghost of St. Michael's (1941) - Stock
 Old Bill and Son (1941) - Chimp
 The Saint's Vacation (1941) - Marko
 "Pimpernel" Smith (1941) - Bertie Gregson
 The Big Blockade (1942) - Naval officer (uncredited)
 Penn of Pennsylvania (1942) - (uncredited)
 This Was Paris (1942) - French Officer (uncredited)
 The Dummy Talks (1943) - Russell Warren
 Bell-Bottom George (1944) - Church
 Meet Sexton Blake! (1945) - Raoul Sudd
 For You Alone (1945) - Max Borrow
 The Seventh Veil (1945) - Dr. Irving
 Teheran (1946) - Paul Sherek
 The Shop at Sly Corner (1947) - Corder Morris
 Uncle Silas (1947) - Dudley Ruthyn
 Children of Chance (1949) - Don Andrea
 Little Big Shot (1952) - Mike Connor (final film role)

References

External links

1915 births
1975 deaths
English male film actors
English male stage actors
Male actors from London
20th-century English male actors